Hiram Mondragon Molina; (born January 20, 1989) in Mexico City, is a Mexican footballer, currently playing for Cruz Azul Hidalgo as a defender in Mexico's Liga de Ascenso.

References

1989 births
Living people
Footballers from Mexico City
Mexican footballers
Association football defenders